Ambroży Mieroszewski (1802–1884) was a Polish painter who was Frédéric Chopin's first known portraitist.

Life
Mieroszewski was active in Warsaw, in the Kingdom of Poland, at least as early as 1829.

Works
Mieroszewski's works included oil portraits, painted in 1829, of composer Frédéric Chopin (the earliest known portrait of him); his parents — Nicolas Chopin (1771–1844) and Justyna Chopin, née Krzyżanowska (1782–1861); the older sister of Fryderyk (as he then was) Ludwika (1807–1855), and his younger sister Izabela (1811–1881). In that same year, Mieroszewski also painted a portrait of the Fryderyk's first professional piano teacher, Wojciech Żywny.

All six portraits were the property of Laura Ciechomska of Warsaw when they were lost in the opening days of World War II, in September 1939.  Only black-and-white photographs of them survive, though attempts have been made to reconstruct the paintings in color—the portrait of Fryderyk (Frédéric), in 1968 by Anna Chamiec; the other Chopin family members, in 1969 by Jan Zamoyski; and Wojciech Żywny, in 1969 by Jadwiga Kunicka-Bogacka.

The set of five 1829 portraits of the surviving members of the Chopin family (the youngest child, Emilia, had died of tuberculosis at age 14 in 1827) were painted about a year before Fryderyk would leave Warsaw and his native land forever in November 1830.

The 19-year-old composer's portrait provides unique iconographic evidence of the state of his health this early into his precocious career.  In 1913 Édouard Ganche wrote that the portrait shows "a youth threatened by tuberculosis.  His skin is very white, he has a prominent Adam's apple and sunken cheeks, even his ears show a form characteristic of consumptives."  His younger sister Emilia had already died of tuberculosis in 1827, and his father would do so in 1844.

See also
List of Poles

Notes

References
Zdzisław Jachimecki, "Chopin, Fryderyk Franciszek," Polski słownik biograficzny, vol. III, Kraków, Polska Akademia Umiejętności, 1937, pp. 420–26.

External links
 Ambroży Mieroszewski's portrait of Wojciech Żywny, 1829

1802 births
1884 deaths
19th-century Polish painters
19th-century Polish male artists
Polish portrait painters
Polish male painters